Alaeddin Keykubad may refer to:

 Kayqubad I, aka Alaeddin Keykubad I (d. 1237)
 Kayqubad II, aka Alaeddin Keykubad II (d. 1256)
 Kayqubad III, aka Alaeddin Keykubad III (d. 1302)